Prior to 1994, immigrants from elsewhere faced discrimination and even violence in South Africa. After majority rule in 1994, contrary to expectations, the incidence of xenophobia increased.

The Grahamstown xenophobic attacks that took place on 21 October 2015, and coincided with the FeesMustFall protest at Rhodes University,  lasted for several days.

The attacks were instigated by the taxi drivers' protests, where the drivers' were protesting over the terrible state of roads, the rise in crime and rumours of murders committed by foreigners. Their demands were that the mayor ought to do something about their grievances. Their grievances were not addressed by the mayor.

On 21 October 2015 taxi drivers attacked spaza shops owned by Pakistani, Somali, Bangladeshi and Ethiopian residents of Grahamstown. There was a mobilisation of people by the taxi drivers, with the aim of attacking and looting shops owned by foreigners. There was a rumour that insinuated that foreigners were responsible for the rampant murders in town: that an "Arab man had killed and mutilated women" around town and that the police had not done anything to address these rumours. Grahamstown residents in the townships were angry at the police for not doing anything to dispel the rumours, despite having been warned by the councillors that the residents might end up taking the law into their own hands. Thus, it was these rumours that incited the attacks on foreigners.

On 23 October, the Makana Municipality held a town meeting at City Hall. The meeting was focused on how the municipality and the South African police would pacify the residents and address the situation. During that meeting, there was no representative from the police and one of the ward councillors further legitimized the attacks through xenophobic sentiments centred on not giving foreigners a platform to have their own shops. The attacks continued, with taxi drivers transporting looters for free, according to the residents of Grahamstown.

Reports from the residents alleged that the police's attitudes were that of indifference, with some participating in the looting. The policing of the attacks was elitist as there was a line on Beaufort street which pointed out where looting would be tolerated and where it would not be. Thus, looting was allowed in the township and not tolerated in town. The police only pacified the situation and restored order after a week of attacks and looting. The xenophobic attacks in Grahamstown differed from the usual xenophobic attacks in South Africa as the ones in Grahamstown were mostly targeted at Muslims. The main reason why Muslims were targeted was mainly due to the rumour that an Arab man was responsible for the murder of women in the town.

2016 Tshwane riots 

From 20–23 June 2016 a wave of riots hit the City of Tshwane.  Although the riots were sparked by political discontent within the ANC, Somali, Pakistani and other foreign owned shops and micro enterprises were targeted for looting and a number of foreigners were attacked.

2017 Anti-immigration Protest 
On Friday 24 February 2017 a large scale and officially sanctioned anti-immigrant protest was organised and held in the Pretoria.  Protesters marched to the Foreign Ministry and handed a petition to government representatives.  Protesters accused immigrants of taking jobs from South Africans, causing crime, and complained that "[t]hey are arrogant and they don't know how to talk to people, especially Nigerians."  136 protesters were arrested during the march.

2019 Durban riots 
On 25 March 2019 xenophobic riots targeting African immigrants broke out in Sydenham, Jadhu Place and Overport areas of Durban.  Around one hundred people attacked businesses owned by foreign nationals resulting in around 50 people seeking shelter in a local police station and mosque.  Three people were killed in the riot.  A speech given by President Cyril Ramaphosa at the ANC's election manifesto for the 2019 South African general election was blamed for contributing to xenophobic feeling wherein Ramaphosa committed to cracking down on undocumented foreigners involved in criminal activities.  The attacks on foreigners was criticised by both the South African government and political parties amidst calls to ensure that xenophobic sentiment was not exploited for electoral purposes.

2019 Johannesburg riots 

On 1 September 2019, riots and looting targeting shops owned by foreign nationals broke out in Jeppestown and Johannesburg CBD following the death of a taxi driver. By 3 September, police had made 189 arrests for looting. Around 50 businesses predominantly owned by Nigerians from the rest of the continent were reportedly destroyed or damaged during the incident. The riots coincided with a nationwide truck driver strike protesting against the employment of non-South African truckers. After riots resulted in 12 deaths in the first week of September, 640 of an estimated 100,000 Nigerians in South Africa signed up to take free flights offered by Nigeria to return to their home country. The riots led to a sit-in protest in Greenmarket Square, Cape Town by refugees demanding to be relocated to a third country outside of South Africa and other than their country of origin.

2020–present 
Reports of xenophobic attacks targeting foreign truck drivers and other foreigners were recorded during the 2021 South African unrest.

Operation Dudula 
Reports of harassment of immigrant traders in Soweto and Johannesburg by a group dubbed "Operation Dudula" (meaning: "to push" in isiZulu) began emerging in mid-January 2022. This was preceded by a social media campaign in June 2020 calling for action against immigrants under the Operation Dudula banner. The Tsietsi Mashinini Centre in Soweto, a known refuge for refugees and foreign nationals, was raided by supporters of Operation Dudula on 6 February 2022. On 12 and 13 February 2022 residents of Soweto and Alexandra marched to Hillbrow and Orange Grove under the Operation Dudula banner to forcibly remove foreigners claiming that undocumented foreign nationals were responsible for rising levels of crimes and immoral activity such as drug dealing and prostitution. High rates of unemployment and lack of economic opportunities for South African nationals were also cited as grievances by the group. Police forcibly dispersed the Operation Dudula marchers which resulted in clashes between the two groups. Representatives of Operation Dudula denied that their movement was xenophobic despite their stated aim to unilaterally forcibly evict illegal foreigners from South Africa.

Dudula Movement 
The Dudula Movement, a similar although unrelated movement to Operation Dudula, emerged around the same time in Alexandra, Johannesburg. Acting as a vigilante organisation it targets foreign nationals its members believe to be undocumented. They deny targeting only black undocumented foreigners but undocumented foreigners of all races and national origins. Members of the movement have expressed grievances with lawlessness, unemployment, and a lack of economic opportunities as reasons for joining.

Reactions 
South African Small Business Development Minister Lindiwe Zulu said that foreign business owners cannot expect to co-exist peacefully with local business owners unless they share their trade secrets. According to Zulu, foreign business owners had an advantage over South African business owners due to marginalisation under apartheid. "They cannot barricade themselves in and not share their practices with local business owners," Zulu said. The comments were met with widespread criticism.

An inquiry by the Competition Commission – the country's anti-trust regulator, has indicated that a difference in performance between foreign and local business owners has created a perception that foreigners are more successful than locals. While there is nothing wrong with examining the dynamics of competition, the insinuation that foreign business owners were to blame for the decline of South African-owned small business was worrying.

Vanya Gastrow, a researcher from the African Centre for Migration in Johannesburg, published a case study on the economics of small traders in South Africa. The study titled "Somalinomics", outlined the trade practices of Somali traders in South Africa. According to Gastrow, most small foreign retailers set a low mark-up to make a high turnover, they locate their businesses in highly trafficked pedestrian areas, they open early and close late and have a wider product range.

The South African Broadcasting Corporation conducted an interview with social media analyst Preetesh Sewraj which warned of the impact of fake news stories which were being used to create panic amongst South Africans.

Politics 
Xenophobic statements were commonly made by politicians from a wide range of political parties during the 2019 South African general election. This has intensified as the ruling party risks losing its dominance of the political landscapes and parties from across the spectrum have relied on anti-immigrant messaging to bolster electoral support. Much of the local mobilisation appears rooted in struggles to control lucrative township tenders.

The politician Herman Mashaba and his political party ActionSA have consistently advocated a hard-line position against immigration resulting in accusations by other political parties that they are xenophobic or pandering to xenophobic sentiments.  Some of Mashaba's statements have been linked by the civil society organizations Amnesty International and Right2Know to incidence of xenophobic attacks and anti-migrant sentiment. In addition to ActionSA political parties such as the ANC, Congress of the People, DA, Economic Freedom Fighters (EFF), Freedom Front Plus, IFP, and Patriotic Alliance have all made statements or committed actions that have been regarded as xenophobic or voicing xenophobic sentiment.

Legislation 
In 2020 the Gauteng Provincial government controversially proposed Gauteng Township Economic Development Bill which seeks to prevent businesses operated by foreign nationals without official South African residency from operating businesses in the province's informal economy. Supporters of the bill state that it will reduce xenophobia by clearing up regulatory regimes that foreigners are accused of regularly violating whilst detractors of the bill state that its explicit targeting of foreigners is itself xenophobic and legitimises xenophobia.

In March 2022, Employment and Labour Minister Thulas Nxesi introduced a draft National Labour Migration Policy that lays out a quota system that limits the number of foreign nationals employed in certain sectors of the economy. The draft legislation has been criticized as xenophobic.

See also
 Immigration to South Africa
Racism in South Africa
 Operation Fiela
 Illegal immigration to South Africa

References

Further reading
 Adam, Heribert, and Kogila Moodley, eds. Imagined liberation: Xenophobia, citizenship and identity in South Africa, Germany and Canada (African Sun Media, 2015). online
 Akinola, Adeoye O. ed. The Political Economy of Xenophobia in Africa (Springer, 2018) 128pp.
 Gordon, Steven Lawrence. "Understanding xenophobic hate crime in South Africa." Journal of Public Affairs 20.3 (2020): e2076.
 Gordon, Steven. "Citizens’ preferences for tackling xenophobic violence in an African context: A South African case study." Peace and Conflict: Journal of Peace Psychology (2021).
 Kerr, Philippa, Kevin Durrheim, and John Dixon. "Xenophobic violence and struggle discourse in South Africa." Journal of Asian and African Studies 54.7 (2019): 995-1011. online
 Landau, Loren B., eds. 'Exorcising the Demons Within: Xenophobia, Violence and Statecraft in Contemporary South Africa.' (Wits University Press, 2011) 
 Makhado, Mashudu Peter, and Tshifhiwa Rachel Tshisikhawe. "How Apartheid Education Encouraged and Reinforced Tribalism and Xenophobia in South Africa." in Impact of Immigration and Xenophobia on Development in Africa (IGI Global, 2021) pp. 131–151.
 Mudau, Tshimangadzo Selina, and Fumane Portia Khanare. "Xenophobia in Higher Education in South Africa." in Impact of Immigration and Xenophobia on Development in Africa (IGI Global, 2021) pp. 173–187.
 Neocosmos, Michael. From ‘Foreign Natives’ to ‘Native Foreigners’: Explaining Xenophobia in Post-apartheid South Africa, Citizenship and Nationalism, Identity and Politics (2010).
 Nyamnjoh, Francis B. Insiders and Outsiders: Citizenship and Xenophobia in Contemporary Southern Africa (Zed, 2006)
 Tafira, Hashi Kenneth. Xenophobia in South Africa: A History (Palgrave Macmillan, 2018).
 Tarisayi, Kudzayi Savious, and Sadhana Manik. "An unabating challenge: Media portrayal of xenophobia in South Africa." Cogent Arts & Humanities 7.1 (2020): 1859074. online

External links
 One Night in Snake Park: Violence, Xenophobia, and Corruption in South Africa's Townships
 Xenowatch: Monitoring and Mapping Xenophobia in South Africa
 I Want to Go Home Forever:  Stories of Becoming and Belonging in South Africa’s Great Metropolis
 IOL – Xenophobia Special Report
 Exorcising the Demons Within: Xenophobia, Violence and Statecraft in Contemporary South Africa 
 M&G – Xenophobia Special Report
 NEWS24 – Xenophobia Special Report
 The Times – Xenophobia Special Report
 Who to Blame and What's to Gain? Reflections on Space, State, and Violence in Kenya and South Africa – Report and AnalysisAfrica Spectrum
 Boston Globe Photo Essay
 Article on the Pogroms in Indian Journal
 Statement on the attacks by the South African shack dwellers' movement Abahlali baseMjondolo
 Foreign Natives to Native Foreigners: explaining xenophobia in contemporary South Africa', Michael Neocosmos, Codesria, Dakar,  2010
 Journalists who documented the death of Ernesto Alfabeto Nhamuave help repatriate his body
 Helene Strauss's "Cinema of social recuperation: Xenophobic violence and migrant subjectivity in contemporary South Africa." Article on Ernesto Alfabeto Nhamuave and Adze Ugah's 'The Burning Man.'
 Reports on Xenophobia from the Forced Migration Studies Programme at Wits University in Johannesburg
 A collection of articles and essays by civil society on the May 2008 Xenophobic attacks
 Ndlovu-Gatsheni: Africa for Africans or Africa for "Natives" Only? "New Nationalism" and Nativism in Zimbabwe and South AfricaAfrica Spectrum, Vol 44, No 1 (2009)
 Rights at Risk: Refugees in the New South Africa, Honors Scholar Program Dissertation, University of Connecticut (2008).
 "A Tale of Two Townships: Political Opportunity, Violent and Non-Violent Local Control in South Africa", Alex Park's paper exploring causal factors of the 2008 violence
 "Broke-on-Broke Violence": What the U.S. press got wrong about South Africa's xenophobic riots, By Kerry Chance, Slate Magazine, 20 June 2008
 The spatial politics of xenophobia: everyday practices of Congolese migrants in Johannesburg, by Jennifer Greenburg, Transformation, 2010
 
 
 

2008 riots
2008 in South Africa
Anti-immigration politics in Africa
Riots and civil disorder in South Africa
Human rights abuses in South Africa
Society of South Africa
Demographics of South Africa
Racism in South Africa
Xenophobia in Africa